The  O.W. Timm Aircraft Company was an American aircraft manufacturer founded by Otto William Timm, based in Los Angeles, California.

History

Between 1911 and 1922 O.W. Timm built several aircraft with varying success before he founded, in 1922, the O.W. Timm Aircraft Company. Timm manufactured six models of a parasol design, the Collegiate. In 1934 Otto and his brother Wally Timm joined to form a new company named the Timm Airplane Company to produce the Timm T-S140, a high wing twin engine aircraft using new features developed at NACA such as flaps and tricycle landing gear. Wally Timm formed his own Glendale based aviation company later on, the Wally Timm Inc.

The company developed a "plastic" material made of resin and wood similar to the Duramold process. The Duramold and Haskelite process was first developed in 1937. Followed by Gene Vidal's Weldwood and later the Aeromold process.

In 1939, at the onset of World War II, the company operated as the Timm Aircraft Corporation, building the PT160K trainer prototype using the aeromold process. By 1941, the U.S Navy ordered the aeromold N2T-1 with a production run reaching 260 aircraft along with other small aircraft parts made of the aeromold process. Profits increased to $70,000 from $240 the year prior. The company also license-built 436 of the CG-4A glider used by allied troops. A Plywood construction variant, the CG-4B was developed by Timm in case of material shortages, but did not go into production.

In some episodes of the 1941 movie serial, Sky Raiders, aircraft hangars of Timm Aircraft Corporation are clearly visible. They were located adjacent to the Van Nuys Airport in Van Nuys, Los Angeles.

After World War II, the company specialized in returning surplus Douglas C-47 aircraft back into airliner configurations. The company also created a subsidiary, Timm Industries, Inc to manufacture vending machines such as the Frank-O-Matic and Coca-Cola bottle dispensers.

By 1948, production had ceased to the point where the company leased out its production facilities to the Marquardt Corporation, a maker of Ramjet engines.

In 1953, a proxy war among shareholders was started, with C. D. Rudolph winning control of the board. The company did not produce any new aircraft after this point. In 1957, the company merged with the International Glass Corporation.

Aircraft

References

Notes

Bibliography

 Andrade, John M. U.S. Military Aircraft Designations and Serials since 1909. Earl Shilton, Leister, UK: Midland Counties Publications, 1979. .
 Hansen, James R. ed. The Wind and Beyond: A Documentary Journey Into the History of Aerodynamics, Volume I: The Ascent of the Airplane. Washington, D.C.: National Aeronautics and Space Administration, 2003.
 Juptner, Joseph P. U.S. Civil Aircraft Series, Volume 8. New York: McGraw-Hill Professional, 1993. .
 Mrazek, James. Airborne Combat: The Glider War/Fighting Gliders of WWII (Stackpole Military History Series). Stackpole, 2011. .

External links

 Van Nuys Airport Marquardt Plant Site – Mark A. Reynosa Productions
 Advertisement for Job Opportunities at Timm Aircraft – Newspapers.com

Defunct aircraft manufacturers of the United States
Manufacturing companies based in Los Angeles
Companies based in Glendale, California
Van Nuys, Los Angeles
1922 establishments in California
1953 disestablishments in California
Manufacturing companies established in 1922
Manufacturing companies disestablished in 1953
Defunct manufacturing companies based in Greater Los Angeles